Tibial hemimelia-polysyndactyly-triphalangeal thumb syndrome is a rare genetic limb malformation syndrome which is characterized by thumb triphalangy, polysyndactyly of the hand and foot, and hypoplasia/aplasia of the tibia bone. Additional features include short stature, radio-ulnar synostosis, ectrodactyly and abnormalities of the carpals and metatarsals. Only 19 affected families worldwide have been recorded in medical literature. It is associated with a heterozygous base pair substitution of A to G in position 404–406, located on intron 5 in the LMBR1 gene.

References 

Genetic diseases and disorders
Rare genetic syndromes
Syndromes affecting stature
Congenital disorders of musculoskeletal system